() is a municipality in Troms og Finnmark county, Norway. The administrative centre of the municipality is the village of Mehamn. The other main villages in Gamvik include Gamvik and Skjånes. Gamvik is known as one of the poorest and most undeveloped municipalities in Norway. The number of inhabitants rose at one moment in 2012, but in 2014, after the fish factory closed, the population declined dramatically with the departure of the eastern European fishermen.

Most people live in the village of Mehamn (about 500 inhabitants), which has an airport, Mehamn Airport, and is also a port of call of the hurtigruten coastal boats. The Slettnes Lighthouse near the village of Gamvik is the northernmost lighthouse on the mainland of Europe. Nervei and Langfjordbotn are two very small villages in southern Gamvik that are only accessible by boat. Finnkongkeila is an abandoned village along the Tanafjorden.

The  municipality is the 65th largest by area out of the 356 municipalities in Norway. Gamvik is the 329th most populous municipality in Norway with a population of 1,057.

General information

The municipality of Gamvik was established on 1 January 1914 when the old Tana Municipality was divided into three municipalities: Tana (population: 1,426) in the south, Berlevåg (population: 784) in the northeast, and Gamvik (population: 1,371) in the northwest. The municipal boundaries have not changed since that time.

On 1 January 2020, the municipality became part of the newly formed Troms og Finnmark county. Previously, it had been part of the old Finnmark county.

Name
The Old Norse form of the name may have been Gangvík. The first element is then gangr which means "path" and the last element is vík which means "cove" or "wick".

Coat of arms
The coat of arms was granted on 28 September 1990. The official blazon is "Gules, three net needles Or in bend sinister". This means the arms have a red field (background) and the charge is three fishing net sewing needles that are arranged diagonally. The net needles have a tincture of Or which means it is commonly colored yellow, but if it is made out of metal, then gold is used. These needles are a characteristic maritime tool used for making and mending the fishing nets used by local fishermen. These arms were chosen to emphasize the importance of fishing in the area.

Churches
The Church of Norway has one parish within the municipality of Gamvik. It is part of the Hammerfest prosti (deanery) in the Diocese of Nord-Hålogaland.

History
In June 1972 construction started for [a landside terminal and] running a SOSUS cable into the sea. The SOSUS station was one of more than twenty worldwide.

1982 air crash

On 12 March 1982, a Widerøe Twin Otter, registration number LN-BNK, crashed into the sea near Mehamn, killing all fifteen on board. More than twenty years and four rounds of investigation later, this incident remained highly controversial in Norway.

Government
All municipalities in Norway, including Gamvik, are responsible for primary education (through 10th grade), outpatient health services, senior citizen services, unemployment and other social services, zoning, economic development, and municipal roads. The municipality is governed by a municipal council of elected representatives, which in turn elect a mayor.  The municipality falls under the Øst-Finnmark District Court and the Hålogaland Court of Appeal.

Municipal council
The municipal council  of Gamvik is made up of 13 representatives that are elected to four year terms. The party breakdown of the council is as follows:

Mayors
The mayors of Gamvik (incomplete list):
2019–present: Alf Normann Hansen (SV)
2015-2019: Trond Einar Olaussen (Ap)

Geography
The municipality consists of the eastern half of the Nordkinn Peninsula. Kinnarodden, located in Gamvik,  is the northernmost point of mainland Europe (the more well-known North Cape is located nearby on Magerøya island). The Tanafjorden flows along the eastern coast of Gamvik. Lebesby Municipality is located to the west and Tana Municipality is located to the south. Across the fjord to the east is Berlevåg Municipality.

Climate
The inhabited places of Gamvik, such as Mehamn, has a boreal climate (Köppen climate classification: Dfc). The spring is very late to warm up and is among the coldest in Norway. Summers are short and cool. Winters are moderated by the Barents Sea and only slightly colder than in the capital Oslo. However, winds can be strong in winter. Slettnes Lighthouse, located on an exposed headland in the northern part of the municipality, is the only remaining weather station in mainland Norway with a tundra climate with the 1991-2020 normals. 
The all-time high in Gamvik municipality is  recorded at Slettnes Lighthouse in July 1972, and the second warmest is  recorded at Slettnes in July 2018. The all-time low in Gamvik is  recorded February 1985 at Slettnes. Overnight freezes are very rare in summer and has never happened in July.

Birdlife
The area surrounding the lighthouse at Slettnes is also an interesting locality for those interested in birds and birdwatching. There is a nature reserve and bird observatory.

Notable people
 Tor Henriksen (1933  in Gamvik – 2017) politician for the Socialist Left Party
 Torgeir Vassvik (born 1963) a Norwegian Sami musician and composer
 Ragnhild Vassvik Kalstad (born 1966 in Gamvik) politician for the Labour Party
 Eivind Eriksen (born 1973 in Mehamn) a Norwegian former footballer with over 150 club caps

References

External links

Municipal fact sheet from Statistics Norway 
Mehamnulykken -- NRK's collection of articles about the 1982 air crash. 
Mehamn.net: live webcam at Mehamn
Nordic Safari Wildlife Adventures: Mehamn
Gamvik Museum

 
Municipalities of Troms og Finnmark
Populated places of Arctic Norway
Barents Sea
1914 establishments in Norway